Bistrica is a village in the municipality of Bitola, North Macedonia. It lies about 6.31 kilometres away from Bitola, which is the second largest city in North Macedonia.

Demographics
According to the 2002 census, the village had a total of 1015 inhabitants. Ethnic groups in the village include:

Macedonians 949 
Albanians 55 
Serbs 8 
Others 3

References

External links

Villages in Bitola Municipality